Page Fifty-Four Pictures is an American independent entertainment production company founded by Alex Saks, located in Los Angeles, California. It specializes in film production, and film finance.

History
In 2018, Alex Saks launched Page Fifty-Four Pictures a production and film finance company, following the shuttering of her previous company June Pictures.

The company has produced The Glorias a biographical film about Gloria Steinem, directed by Julie Taymor, starring Julianne Moore and Alicia Vikander, El Tonto directed by Charlie Day, and Chemical Hearts directed by Richard Tanne.

Filmography

References

External links
 

Film production companies of the United States
Companies based in Los Angeles
Mass media companies established in 2018